Tornos is a genus of geometrid moths in the family Geometridae erected by Morrison in 1875. There are about 17 described species in Tornos.

Species
These 17 species belong to the genus Tornos:

 Tornos abjectarius Hulst, 1887 i c g b
 Tornos apiatus Rindge, 1954 c g
 Tornos benjamini Cassino & Swett, 1925 i c g b
 Tornos brutus Rindge, 1954 c g
 Tornos capitaneus Rindge, 1954 c g
 Tornos cinctarius Hulst, 1887 i c g b
 Tornos erectarius Grossbeck, 1909 i c g b
 Tornos hoffmanni Rindge, 1954 i c g
 Tornos mistus Rindge, 1954 c g
 Tornos penumbrosa Dyar, 1914 c g
 Tornos phoxus Rindge, 1954 c g
 Tornos punctata (Druce, 1899) i c g
 Tornos pusillus Druce, 1898 c g
 Tornos quadripuncta Warren, 1897 c g
 Tornos scolopacinaria (Guenée in Boisduval & Guenée, 1858) i c g b (dimorphic gray)
 Tornos spinosus Rindge, 1954 c g
 Tornos umbrosarius Dyar, 1910 c g

Data sources: i = ITIS, c = Catalogue of Life, g = GBIF, b = Bugguide.net

References

Further reading

External links

 

Boarmiini
Articles created by Qbugbot